NXT Stand & Deliver (originally known as NXT TakeOver: Stand & Deliver) is a professional wrestling event produced by WWE, a Connecticut-based professional wrestling promotion. Held primarily for wrestlers from the promotion's NXT brand division, it takes place annually during WrestleMania week. The inaugural event was available through pay-per-view worldwide and the livestreaming services Peacock in the United States and the WWE Network internationally, while the events since have only been available via the livestreaming services.

Stand & Deliver was originally established in 2021 and held under the NXT TakeOver series. In September 2021, NXT was rebranded and reverted to being WWE's developmental territory, and the TakeOver series was discontinued; however, Stand & Deliver continued on as its own event for NXT. While the original event was held across two nights, it was reduced to one day beginning with the second event. The inaugural event also featured wrestlers from NXT's sub-brand, NXT UK.

History
NXT TakeOver was a series of periodic professional wrestling events produced by WWE for the company's NXT brand. The 34th TakeOver event was held as NXT TakeOver: Stand & Deliver and was the only TakeOver to be held across two nights. The event was held on April 7 and 8, 2021, during WrestleMania 37 week. It aired on traditional pay-per-view (PPV) worldwide and the WWE Network in international markets, and was WWE's first live in-ring event to air on Peacock after the American version of the WWE Network had shutdown on April 4 that year, following its merger under Peacock. Due to the COVID-19 pandemic, the event was held at the Capitol Wrestling Center within the WWE Performance Center in Orlando, Florida.

In September 2021, the NXT brand went through a restructuring, reverting to a developmental territory for WWE. The Capitol Wrestling Center name was also dropped with NXT's events just being promoted as held at the Performance Center. The TakeOver series was also subsequently discontinued.

On January 24, 2022, it was confirmed that Stand & Deliver would continue on as its own event for NXT with a second Stand & Deliver event announced to be held during WrestleMania 38 weekend, thus establishing Stand & Deliver as NXT's annual event held during WrestleMania week. This second Stand & Deliver was scheduled to be held as a one-day event at the American Airlines Center in Dallas, Texas on April 2, 2022, the same day as WrestleMania 38 Night 1. Due to this, Stand & Deliver had a special start time of 1pm Eastern Time. This was the first NXT event to be held outside of Florida since the start of the COVID-19 pandemic in March 2020, and subsequently the first NXT event to be held outside of NXT's home arenas—Full Sail University (former) and the WWE Performance Center (current)—since NXT TakeOver: Portland in February 2020.

On November 3, 2022, WWE announced that the third Stand & Deliver would be held on April 1, 2023, during the day of WrestleMania 39 Night 1. It will air live from the Crypto.com Arena in Los Angeles, California.

Events

See also
List of WWE pay-per-view and WWE Network events

References

Recurring events established in 2021
WWE Network events
WWE pay-per-view events